Wadja Egnankou is a scientist from Côte d'Ivoire, a researcher at the University of Abidjan. He received the Goldman Environmental Prize in 1992 for his efforts to protect the mangrove forests of the country.

References

Year of birth missing (living people)
Living people
Ivorian environmentalists
Academic staff of Université Félix Houphouët-Boigny
Goldman Environmental Prize awardees